During the 2005–06 English football season, Preston North End F.C. competed in the Football League Championship.

Season summary
In the 2005–06 season, Billy Davies and his assistant David Kelly were rewarded for their success with new and improved contracts in June 2005 and repaid the board's faith by leading Preston to the play-offs for the second year in succession. However, this time they were knocked out in the semi-final stage by Leeds United.

In June 2006, Davies left his post at Deepdale to become manager of Derby County.

Final league table

Results
Preston North End's score comes first

Legend

Football League Championship

Football League Championship play-offs

FA Cup

League Cup

First-team squad
Squad at end of season

Left club during season

References

2005-06
Preston North End